"Lucky Me" is a song by Australian pop group Bachelor Girl. The song was released in April 1999 as the third single from the group's debut studio album, Waiting for the Day (1998). The song was written by the group's keyboardist, James Roche. The music video was filmed inside Glen Waverley Shopping Centre.

Track listing
 CD single
 "Lucky Me" - 4:32
 "I Don't Believe You" - 4:01
 "Treat Me Good" - 4:31

Charts

Release history

References

Bachelor Girl songs
1999 singles
1998 songs